Borna Ćorić defeated the defending champion Roger Federer in the final, 7–6(8–6), 3–6, 6–2 to win the singles tennis title at the 2018 Halle Open. It was his first ATP 500 title. With Federer's loss, Rafael Nadal regained the world No. 1 ranking.

Seeds

Draw

Finals

Top half

Bottom half

Qualifying

Seeds

Qualifiers

Lucky losers

Qualifying draw

First qualifier

Second qualifier

Third qualifier

Fourth qualifier

References

 Main draw
 Qualifying draw

2018 Gerry Weber Open